The Piscirickettsiaceae are a family of Pseudomonadota. All species are aerobes found in water.
The species Piscirickettsia salmonis is a fish pathogen and causes piscirickettsiosis in salmonid fishes.
It lives in cells of infected hosts and cannot be cultured on artificial media. Piscirickettsia salmonis is nonmotile, whereas the other five genera are motile by using a single flagellum.

References

External links
Piscirickettsiosis Australian Government Department of Agriculture, Fisheries and Forestry
Piscirickettsiaceae J.P. Euzéby: List of Prokaryotic names with Standing in Nomenclature

 
Thiotrichales